The 2007 División de Honor de Béisbol was the 22nd season of the top Spanish baseball league since its establishment. It started on March 2007 and finished on 5 August.

Marlins Puerto Cruz achieved its third consecutive title.

Format
The twelve teams of the league were divided into two groups of six teams each. The first stage consisted in a double round-robin where the three first qualified teams of each group joined the Group 1 for the title and the rest of the teams the group 2 for avoiding relegation to Primera División.

In the second stage only are counted games against rivals of the same group.

First stage

Group A

Group B

First stage

Group A

Group B

References

External links
Spanish Baseball and Softball Federation website

División de Honor de Béisbol